Christian Biet (12 May 1952 – 13 July 2020) was a French professor of theatrical studies. His main work focused on the aesthetics of theatre.

Biography
Biet was born into a family of teachers. After his secondary studies and khâgne at the Lycée Condorcet, he worked as an auditor at the École normale supérieure de Saint-Cloud. Alongside his close friends, Jean-Luc Rispali and Jean-Paul Brighelli, Biet succeeded with his aggregation in 1975. In 1982, they published a series of historical works for Lagarde et Michard. They collaborated on other works regarding Alexandre Dumas and surrealism.

After completing his education, Biet worked as a lecturer at Paris Nanterre University before becoming a theatre professor in 1986. He supervised 42 theses at Paris Nanterre. He also served as the director of the History and Arts Representation unit at the University. He became a member of the Institut Universitaire de France in 2006, and started working for Théâtre/Public in 2007.

Christian Biet died in a traffic collision in Poitiers on 13 July 2020 at the age of 68.

Publications

Author
XVIe - XVII e siècles (1982)
XVIIe-XVIIIe siècles (1982)
XIXe siècle (1982)
Les miroirs du Soleil : Littératures et classicisme au siècle de Louis XIV, coll. « Découvertes Gallimard » (nº 58), série Littératures (1989); new edition in 2000 under the title Les miroirs du Soleil : Le roi Louis XIV et ses artistes
Œdipe en monarchie, tragédie et théorie juridique à l’âge classique (1994)
La Médecine au temps de Molière (1995)
Les tragédies de Racine (1995)
Moi, Pierre Corneille, coll. « Découvertes Gallimard » (nº 484), série Littératures. (2005)
Qu'est-ce que le théâtre ? (2006)
Le théâtre, la violence et les arts en Europe (XVIè-XVIIè) (2011)

Editor
Œdipe (1999)
Une histoire du spectacle militant ; théâtre et cinéma militants, 1966-1981 (2007)
Performance : expérimentation et théorie du théâtre aux USA (2008)
Le théâtre français du XVIIe siècle : histoire, textes choisis, mises en scène (2009)
Tragédies et récits de martyres en France : fin XVIe-début XVIIe siècle (2012)
La question du répertoire au théâtre (2018)

Prefaces
Le mythe de l'authenticité, lectures, interprétations, dramaturgies de Britannicus de Jean Racine en France, 1669-2004 by Karel Vanhaesebrouck (2006)
Mythes et mythologies dans la littérature française by Pierre Albouy (2012)

Articles
Christian Biet published numerous articles in Communications, Droit et Société, Le Fablier, Revue des Amis de Jean de La Fontaine, Les Cahiers du GRIF, Littératures classiques, Théâtre/Public, and others.

References

1952 births
2020 deaths
Historians of theatre
20th-century French non-fiction writers
21st-century French non-fiction writers